Chris Jennings is a Canadian jazz (left handed) double bassist, composer, arranger and educator.

Biography

Early life and career 
Growing up in Calgary, Alberta, Canada, he began studying music early on piano and classical guitar before moving to electric bass and then double bass. He had numerous occasions in Calgary at a very young age to perform with local musicians as well as to accompany artists from abroad such as Sheila Jordan, Edgar Meyer, Hugh Fraser, Jens Lindemann, Dee Daniels as well as attending the Banff Centre for the Arts Jazz Workshop in 1996 under the direction of Kenny Wheeler.

He move to Toronto, Ontario, in 1996 to complete a bachelor's degree in Music Performance at the University of Toronto, he composed and performed his own music and also worked with local artists such as Mike Murley, Bob Brough, Dave Restivo, Kirk MacDonald, Mark Duggan, Great Bob Scott, David Occhipinti, Michael Occhipinti, Phil Dwyer, Roy Styffe, Brian Dickinson, Mark Duggan, Richard Underhill, Barry Romberg, Nich Fraser, Geoff Young, Adrean Farrugia, Mark Adam, Anthony Michelli, David French etc.

The Banff Centre for the Arts played an extremely important role in his artistic and personal development, with numerous longterm residencies (2000 to 2010) to develop his playing and his original compositions. This included a number of eclectic albums recorded and produced with the gracious help of the Banff Centre for the Arts (listed in the discography)

European life and career (since 2002 to date) 

Moving to Europe in 2002, he has established himself as an international Canadian double bassist based in Paris, France.

With guitarist Nguyên Lê he is currently in his "Fire & Water Trio" with percussionist Stephan Edouard and Nguyên Lê's "Streams" Quartet  featuring vibraphonist Illya Amar & New York percussionist John Hadfield. He first appeared in Nguyên Lê's Fragile Beauty Group with Huong Thanh in 2007 and since, and later in a quartet with Rita Marcotulli and Danny Gottlieb as well as in many different formations of Nguyên Lê with Karim Ziad, Jan Bang, Bojan Zulfikarpasic, Rick Margitza, Paul McCandless, Rudresh Mahanthappa, Himiko Paganotti, Cathy Renoir, Alex Tran, and Mark Guiliana, Stéphane Galland, Françsis Lassus and Joel Allouche.

As bassist of the Dhafer Youssef quartet with Tigran Hamasyan and Mark Guiliana, this group toured extensively from 2009 to 2012. Other formations performing with Dhafer Youssef include with pianist Kristjan Randalu and drummers Chander Sarjoe and Ferenc Nemeth, guitarist Eivind Aarset, Turkish clarinetist Hüsnü Şenlendirici and cymbalum player Aytaç Dogan, Danish percussionist Marilyn Mazur and Norwegen trumpetist Nils Petter Molvaer, pianist Marcin Wasilewski and drummer Satoshi Takeishi. In summer 2017 he returned on tour with Dhafer's American quartet with pianist Aaron Parks and drummer Ferenc Nemeth.

In 2015 he began as bassist with pianist Joachim Kühn's "New Trio", with drummer Eric Schaefer. They have two albums on ACTMusic and the trio performed with drummer Gary Husband and trumpetist Enrico Rava. He is also bassist with the Céline Bonacina Quartet with pianist Gwilym Simcock (Pat Metheny's pianist) and percussionist Asaf Sirkis, as well as the Loïs le Van Quartet with saxophonist Sylvain Rifflet and pianist Bruno Ruder.

He also took on a melodic role, as well as bassist, in the creation of Titi Robin's "Nargis" Trio  with Iranian percussionist Habib Meftah.

In 2017 he became bassist with the Gregory Privat Trio (music mixing jazz and music from La Martinique)  as well as the bassist in David Linx's new quartet and the trio of pianist David Aubail "DAT" with drummer Karim Ziad, Céline Bonacina's "Fly Fly" Trio as double bassist and contributing extensively to the trio's repertoire and Macha Gharabian's trio with Belgium drummer Dré Pallemaerts.

Other projects as a side man include numerous projects with Turkish ney player Kudsi Erguner, as well as the El Gusto traditional Chaâbi orchestra, Slovenian pianist Marko Crncec with saxophonist Mark Shim and drummers Ludwig Afonso and Rudy Royston, the Thomas Enhco Trio, the Jacek Kochan/Dave Liebman Quartet in Eastern Europe, the Lee Konitz/Giovanni Ceccerelli Quartet, pianist Kenny Werner and Benjamin Koopel, Triple Horizon Trio with guitarist Florian Zenker and drummer Arie den Boer. He has also worked with Seamus Blake, Yaron Herman, Valgeir Sigurðsson, John Hadfield, Omri Mor, Terumasa Hino, Kiyohiko Semba, Andy Milne, and Nelson Veras to name a few. He is in guitarist Nguyên Lê's Fire & Water Trio with percussionist Stephane Edouard. Audio-Visual projects include composing and performing for works with Canadian visual artist Dan Hudson.

As leader 
Releasing in 2011 of his self-titled Chris Jennings Quartet CD on Promise Land Records featuring Manu Codjia (el. gtr), Pierre Perchaud (ac. gtr), Patrick Goraguer (drums), he also led the Country Jazz Trio with American drummer Leon Parker for three years. Jennings/Perchaud acoustic duo began 2006, and trio featuring guitarist/percussionist Kevin Seddiki and the young Belgium vocalist revelation Lynn Cassiers since 2011. A co-leader project with trombonist Karin Hammar was created in 2012 featuring Ingrid Jensen. As well as the Chris Jennings Solo Double Bass project and the Chris Jennings String Quintet, his group Drum'n Koto Trio featuring Mieko Miyazaki (Japanese koto) and Patrick Goraguer (drums/santour) whose album received disc of the Day (TSF Jazz Radio France), disc of the week (FIP Radio France) and disc of the month. His latest project the Chris Jennings Piano Quartet + will release their first album in 2022 with the help of Ralf Kemper and Eden Records, recorded in Riverside Studios Cologne Germany, and it features Patrick Goraguer (piano), Kalle Kalima (guitar), Eric Schaefer (drums) and special guest Hayden Chisholm (saxophone).

Studies and teaching 

Since 1996, Jennings completed numerous self-study/project residencies at the Banff Centre for the Arts Canada, a Bachelors (B.A.) in Jazz Performance from the University of Toronto, Canada (2000) and a Masters (M.A.) in Music from the Royal Conservatory of The Hague, the Netherlands (2004). He has studied extensively with his mentors Dale James, Palle Danielsson, John Patitucci, as well as with Don Thompson, Ray Brown, Mark Johnson, Thomas Martin, Edgar Meyer, Hein Van de Geijn, Bruno Chevillon, François Rabbath, Cameron Brown, David Takeno, Menahem Pressler, Dave Young, Jim Vivian, and his first double bass teachers who got him off to the right start John Hyde and Dave Watts.

He is on faculty at the Didier Lockwood Music School (Centre Musiques Didier Lockwood - CMDL), since 2005 and having taught at the Conservatory of Chelles France for 7 years. He does masterclasses across Europe for d'Addario Bowed Strings, David Gage pick-ups and teaches privately.

Instruments and endorsements 

Jennings plays a custom built left-handed Thomas Martin double bass (2004), a Croatian double bass circa 1880 converted into a neck off for air travel by David Gage, a "Lolita" electric double bass by Hervé Prudent (2011) as well as a Saz (Nino le Saz) by luthier Hervé Prudent  and a custom made 6 string electric bass (1992) by Tak Hosono (Ibenez basses) designed and constructed with the help of his mentor legendary Canadian bassist Dale James.

Jennings is endorsed by d'Addario Bowed Strings and by David Gage Realist pick-ups.

Discography

References

External links 
www.chrisjenningsbass.com (official website site) bio
www.chrisjenningsbass.com (official website site) press reviews
Radio France (F.I.P.)
Bassist Magazine (France)
Bassist Mazagine (France)
YouTube featured video channel
 Left-handed & Idiodextrous bassists

Canadian double-bassists
Male double-bassists
1978 births
Living people
Musicians from Calgary
Canadian composers
Canadian male composers
21st-century double-bassists
21st-century Canadian male musicians